Shoyab Shaikh (born 25 November 1993) is an Indian cricketer who plays for Mumbai cricket team in List A and Twenty20 formats. He is a right-handed batsman and occasional right-arm off break bowler. He had played for Mumbai at age-group levels such as Under-14, Under-16, Under-17, Under-19 and Under-22.

Shaikh was signed up by Kolkata Knight Riders for the 2009 Indian Premier League without having played any senior-level cricket. He made his senior cricket debut in that tournament against the Deccan Chargers, but did not get to bat or bowl. He made his List A debut for Mumbai in 2012.

References 

there are multiple

External links 
 

1987 births
Living people
Indian cricketers
Mumbai cricketers
Kolkata Knight Riders cricketers